Several vessels have been named Lizard:

, a smack of 71 tons (bm), was launched at Berwick . She sailed between Leith and Inverness for the Inverness & Leith Shipping Co. She was last listed, with minimal data, in 1836. 
 was a United States privateer schooner commissioned at Salem on 19 February 1814.  captured Lizard on 5 March.

See also
 – any one of 13 vessels or shore establishments of the English or British Royal Navy

Ship names